The Archies Christmas Album is the sixth studio album released by The Archies, a fictional band from the Archie Comics. It is the first Archies album since 1971. It features vocals from Ron Dante back as Archie, as well as Danielle Van Zyl as Betty Cooper and Kelly-Lynn as Veronica.

Track listing
 "Here Comes Santa Claus"
 "Up on the Housetop"
 "Rockin' Around the Christmas Tree"
 "Holly Jolly Christmas"
 "Jingle Bell Rock"
 "I Saw Mommy Kissing Santa Claus"
 "Run Rudolph Run"
 "Santa Claus is Comin' to Town"
 "Have Yourself a Merry Little Christmas"
 "Sleigh Ride"
 "Archies Christmas Party"
 "Christmas in Riverdale"

Personnel

Danielle van Zyl – Vocals 
Kelly-Lynn – Vocals 
Ron Dante – Vocals 
Ted Perlman – Programmer, Keys, Guitar 
Scott Erickson – Programmer, Keys 
Tim Pierce – Guitar 
Bo Donaldson – Keyboards 
George Eisaman – Guitar 
Rick Thibodeau – Bass 
Billy Haarbauer – Drums

References

2008 albums
2008 Christmas albums